Mahapura Gram Panchayat is one of the 23 Gram Panchayat in the block of Chauth Ka Barwara in Sawai Madhopur.

List of villages 

1. Mahapura 

2. Peeplya 

3. Murli Manoharpura

4. Parvati Nagar

References

Villages in Sawai Madhopur district
Gram panchayats in India